Andris Vosekalns (born 26 June 1992) is a Latvian professional road cyclist, who currently rides for UCI Continental team . In 2014 he won the Latvian National Road Race Championships.

Major results

2010
National Junior Road Championships
1st  Road race
1st  Time trial
2nd Overall Tour De La Région De Lodz
2011
2nd Time trial, National Under-23 Road Championships
4th Overall Baltic Chain Tour
2012
2nd Time trial, National Under-23 Road Championships
4th Tallinn–Tartu GP
4th Riga Grand Prix
2014
National Road Championships
1st  Road race
2nd Under-23 time trial
2015
5th Minsk Cup
2017
1st Mountains classification Course Cycliste de Solidarnosc et des Champions Olympiques
2nd Szlakiem Wielkich Jezior
4th Overall Baltic Chain Tour
5th Grand Prix Doliny Baryczy Milicz
6th Road race, National Road Championships
8th Puchar Ministra Obrony Narodowej
2018
7th Time trial, National Road Championships
2019
10th Road race, National Road Championships

References

External links

1992 births
Living people
Latvian male cyclists
Cyclists at the 2010 Summer Youth Olympics
People from Alūksne
European Games competitors for Latvia
Cyclists at the 2019 European Games